Molybdenum (Mo) deficiency occurs when plant growth is limited because the plant cannot take up sufficient quantities of this essential micronutrient from its growing medium. For crops growing in soil, this may be a result of low concentrations of Mo in the soil as a whole (i.e. the parent material of the soil is low in Mo), or because the soil Mo is held in forms that are not available to plants – sorption of Mo is strongest in acid soils.

Functions
In plants, the primary functions of Mo are related to the valence changes that it undergoes a component of enzymes that catalyze diverse redox reactions. This is because the element can exist in a variety of oxidation states; oxidation states IV, V, and VI are important in biological systems. A large number of Mo-deficiency disorders are associated with the disruption of the normal activity of several enzymes involved in nitrogen metabolism.

These enzymes include:
 Nitrogenase, which is required for biological  fixation by both asymbiotic and symbiotic nitrogen-fixing bacteria;
 Xanthine dehydrogenase, which is involved in the synthesis of uric acid from purines.

Symptoms
Molybdenum deficiency symptoms in most plants are associated with a build-up of nitrate in the affected plant part. This is a result of poor nitrate reductase activity. Symptoms include:
 pale leaves with interveinal and marginal chlorosis (yellowing) and necrosis (scald);
 the whiptail disorder in Brassica crops (especially cauliflower);
 decreased tasselling in maize;
 premature germination of maize grain.

In legumes, inhibition of N2 fixation may lead to pale, yellowing, nitrogen-deficient plants. The size and number of root nodules are often reduced.

Soil conditions
Molybdenum deficiency is common in many different types of soil; some soils have low total Mo concentrations, and others have low plant-available Mo due to strong Mo sorption. Symptoms are most common where both conditions apply, such as in acid sandy soils. Molybdenum may be strongly sorbed in ironstone soils. Liming of soils frequently relieves Mo deficiency by decreasing Mo sorption.

Molybdenum requirements
Molybdenum is an essential micronutrient which means it is essential for plant growth and development, but is required in very small quantities.  Although Mo requirements vary among crops, Mo leaf concentrations (on a dry matter basis) in the range  are adequate for most crops.

Treatment
Raising the soil pH by liming frequently relieves Mo deficiency. However, there are many situations where a soil-, seed- or foliar application of a Mo fertilizer is far more cost-effective than the use of lime to increase Mo availability. Compounds used as fertilizers include (in order of decreasing solubility): sodium molybdate, ammonium molybdate, molybdic acid, molybdenum trioxide, and molybdenum sulfide.

References

Physiological plant disorders
Molybdenum